A banneret, or knight banneret, was a medieval knight who led a company of troops during time of war under his own banner.

Banneret may also refer to:

Banneret (Rome), an officer or magistrate of Rome towards the close of the 14th century
 Unions-Banneret, newsletter of the Baptist Union of Norway from 1880
 Banneret Ugham, character in book series The Keys to the Kingdom
HMT Banneret, a civilian trawler requisitioned by the Royal Navy for use in World War II